The Apemen is a Dutch surf rock band, comprising band-members from Tilburg and Rotterdam, with their base remaining in Tilburg.

They have existed since the early 1990s, and has seen several changes in line-up and musical style since their beginning. Their most active period was in the mid-90s when they released all of their records. 
They are famous for wearing gorilla masks and suits on stage combined with various stage acts, including jumping and moving around on stage, shaking hands with the audience, telling jokes between songs and climbing on top of the bar while playing.

Their first album Are you being surfed? (1994) is strictly guitar-oriented, and includes a mix of songs from their first EP and surf classics like Pipeline and Penetration. The personnel on this record was Joep Verbeek and John Peate on guitar, Jeroen van de Sande on bass, and their first drummer Mike Rosema on drums.

Surfvival of de onbeschofste (1995) saw a change in line-up with Joep Verbeek and John Peate quitting the band, Jeroen van de Sande moving from bass to guitar, and David Andriesse filling in on bass. On this record Albert Benier was added to play organ, and he wrote much of the material for this album. The sound on this record is more organ-based with several songs using that as the lead instrument. El rey del Surf is their only vocal song on Surfvival..., and is a Spanish-language version of Trashmen's King of the Surf.
  
After Surfvival of de onbeschofste the group has only recorded one song that has been released: 24 hours from Tulsa which was released on the surf-music tribute to Burt Bacharach That's new Pussycat! (OmOm Records, 2000).

Their live-set mainly comprises songs from Surfvival of de onbeschofste with several numbers from Are you... and songs they have written after Surfvival of de onbeschofste, and has seen little change after their prolific period.

On January 6, 2007 they played their farewell concert in Geel, Belgium. Late 2010 they made their comeback on Burlesque Ballroom in Rotterdam.

Band members

 Jeroen van de Sande - guitar
 Johnny Zuidhof - drums
 Albert Benier - organ
 David Andriesse - bass

Albums

 Are you being surfed?, 10" LP/CD, 1994, Vulcan records (Semaphore)
 Surfvivial of de Onbeschofste, 12" LP/CD, 1995, Nitro! (Demolition Derby)
 Live at KFJC(CDR), CD-R, 1999 [Recorded in Los Altos Hills, CA, USA, spring 1994; Promo CD-R live (250 copies released for special fans)]
 Seven Inches of Love, CD, 2000, Double Crown records [The Apemen's complete 7" vinyl releases, compilation album tracks, 1 unreleased track and two live tracks.]

7"s
 Invasion of the Apemen EP, 7” EP 45 RPM, spring 1993, Kogar records.
 Intoxica (split single w/Monomen), 7” 45 RPM split single, summer 1993, Demolition Derby records.
 Sounds of the Apemen EP, 7” EP 33 RPM, August 1994, Demolition Derby records.
 El Torura/Percolator Stomp, 7” 45 RPM, autumn 1994, Estrus records.

Appearances on compilations

 Estrus Cocktail Companion, 1994
 Surfin Around the World, 1995
 Locked into Surf volume 2, 1995
 Rock music from the Netherlands, 1996
 ANGST! OX! compilation No. 22, 1996
 Locked into Surf Part 1, 1997
 Rockaway Zine (free CDR Sampler), 1999
 That's New Pussycat!, 2000
 Continental Magazine No. 9 Sampler, 2000
 Gremmie's Ghouly Surf Hits, 2001
 Continental Magazine No. 10 Sampler, 2002
 War of the Surf Guitars, 2002
 Diggin for Gold, 2004
 Surf Guitars! Extreme, 2004
 Surf as Art, 2005

External links
 Official Website
 Profile at Rock 'n Roll Sinners Agency (Booking Agency)

Surf music groups
Dutch rock music groups